Kouwenhoven is a Dutch toponymic surname Notable people with the surname include:

 Ben Kouwenhoven (born 1965), Dutch competitive sailor, world champion in 1994 & 1996, twin brother of Jan
 Elly Kouwenhoven (born 1949), Dutch politician and member of the European Parliament
 Ernest Kouwen-Hoven (1875–1940), Dutch-born founder of Indialantic, Florida
 Franciska Kouwenhoven (born 1960s), Dutch representative to the United Nations 
 Guus Kouwenhoven (born 1942), Dutch national who stood trial for arms smuggling and war crimes in Liberia
 Jan Kouwenhoven (born 1965), Dutch competitive sailor, world champion in 1994 & 1996, twin brother of Ben
Leo Kouwenhoven (born 1963), Dutch particle physicist, Spinoza laureate
 Mike Kouwenhoven (born 1959), Canadian-born Dutch ice hockey player
 William B. Kouwenhoven (1886–1975), American electrical engineer and co-inventor of CPR
 Wolfert Gerritse van Couwenhoven (1579–1662), Dutch settler in America in 1625; a founder of the New Netherland colony

References

See also
Coudenhove-Kalergi, Bohemian family. The Dutch part of the surname has the same origin and meaning as Kouwenhoven

Dutch-language surnames
Toponymic surnames